The geography of East Timor exhibits a mountainous terrain on the eastern half of the island of Timor in Southeast Asia (or Oceania depending on definitions). East Timor includes the eastern half of Timor, the Ocussi-Ambeno region on the northwest portion of the island of Timor, and the islands of Atauro and Jaco. The country is located northwest of Australia in the Lesser Sunda Islands at the eastern end of the Indonesian Archipelago. 'Timor' is a Portuguese derivation of 'Timor', the Malay word for "Orient"; the island of Timor is part of the Malay Archipelago and is the largest and easternmost of the Lesser Sunda Islands. East Timor is the only Asian nation to lie entirely within the Southern Hemisphere.

Statistics 
 Area
 Total: 14,874 km²
 Land: 14,874 km²
 Water: 0 km²

 Land boundaries
 Total: 
 Border countries: Indonesia

 Coastline

 Maritime claims
 Territorial sea: 12 nmi
 Contiguous zone: 24 nmo
 Exclusive economic zone:  and 200 nmi

Elevation extremes 

 Lowest point: Timor Sea, Savu Sea, and Banda Sea 0 m
 Highest point: Tatamailau

 Natural resources
Gold, petroleum, natural gas, manganese, marble

 Land use
 Arable land: 10.1%
 Permanent crops: 4.9%
 Permanent pasture: 10.1%
 Forest: 49.1%
 Other: 25.8% (2011)

 Irrigated land
 (2003)

Climate 

Tropical; hot and humid with distinct rainy and dry seasons. Tropical cyclones do occur along with floods.

Environment 
 Natural hazards
Landslides are common; earthquakes; and tsunamis.

Environment - current issues

 Widespread use of slash and burn agriculture has led to deforestation and soil erosion.
 Environment - international agreements
Biodiversity, climate change, climate change-Kyoto Protocol, desertification

References 

Much of the material in this article is adapted from the CIA World Factbook 2000 and 2012.

Further reading